Ruben I,, also Roupen I or Rupen I, (1025/1035 – Kormogolo, 1095) was the first lord of Armenian Cilicia or “Lord of the Mountains” (1080/1081/1082 – 1095). He declared the independence of Cilicia from the Byzantine Empire, thus formally founding the beginning of Armenian rule there. The Roupenian dynasty ruled Cilician Armenia until 1219.

Background 
The Armenian voluntary immigrations into the Byzantine Empire began as early as the 6th century; from the reign of Emperor Maurice (582–602) onwards they were solidly incorporated into the military fabric of the Byzantine army. The Armenian migration to the south-west, began when the Seljuk invasions made life in the Araxes valley and by Lake Van no longer secure. By the mid 10th century, large numbers of Armenian settlements were well underway in Cilicia.

Greater Armenia was ruled by the Bagratids in relative peace and prosperity from the 9th century until 1045 when their capital city of Ani fell. In 1045, King Gagik II was invited to Constantinople; upon arrival there, he was taken captive and under duress was forced to abdicate his throne and relinquish all his right in Armenia in exchange for lands in Cappadocia. Thus Ani was relinquished to Emperor Constantine IX Monomachos who began the resettlement of large numbers of Armenians in Byzantine Cilicia. Gagik was killed by Byzantine orders in 1079, after his own peculiarly atrocious murder of the Archbishop of Caesarea (today Kayseri in Turkey).

The Seldjuks also played a significant role in the Armenian immigration into Cilicia. In 1071, Sultan Alp Arslan put an end to Byzantine dominance in the east with his most convincing victory at the battle on the plains of Manzikert, where Emperor Romanos IV Diogenes was taken captive.

His descent and early years 
The consensus appears to be that the Roupenians were the descendant of the Bagratids, and Roupen was a relative of the last Bagratid king, Gagik II. The Armenian chronicler Kirakos Gandzaketsi speaks of the Roupenians as ‘the sons and descendants of Gagik Artsruni’. Another Armenian chronicler, Vahram, a personal secretary of King Levon II refers to Roupen as ‘a famous chief of the blood royal, Rouben by name’. On the other hand, the claims in these primary sources of a family relationship with the kings of the Bagratid dynasty are implausible. It is felt that, if such a connection had existed, the sources would have given specific details, given the otherwise reasonably complete genealogies which can be reconstructed from the information which they contain.

Roupen, according to the general consensus of the Armenian chroniclers, was a commander in the king’s armies. After the surrender of Ani to Constantine IX, a number of King Gagik II’s princes and loyal adherents, among them Roupen faithfully followed the king’s court into exile and resettled in the district of Caesarea in Cappadocia. However upon the murder of Gagik II, Roupen gathered his family and fled to the Taurus Mountains and took refuge in the fortress of Kopitar (Kosidar) situated north of Sis (today Kozan in Turkey). The territory of the Armenians in the Taurus was hard of access and easy to defend.

The foundation of Armenian Cilicia 
Roupen declared the independence of Cilicia from the Byzantine Empire in 1080. Relying mostly upon what was left of the loyal followers of King Gagik, he developed enough strength to descend gradually towards the heartland of the Cilician plain. He began leading bold and successful military campaigns against the Byzantines, and on one occasion he culminated his venture with the capture of the fortress of Pardzerpert (today Andırın in Turkey) which became a stronghold of the Roupenian dynasty.

At that time, Roupen was outshone by the Armenian Vahram, called Philaretus by the Greeks. Philaretus’ dominion stretched from Tarsus to the lands beyond the river Euphrates; and Roupen became his vassal. They jointly expanded northward and eastward.

In 1086, Malik Shah I conquered much of northern Syria and the Armenian Highlands where he installed new governors who levied repressive taxes on the Armenian inhabitants. Thus the sufferings endured by the Armenians at the hands of the Seljuks became the impetus for many of the Armenians to seek refuges and sanctuaries in Byzantine Anatolia and Cilicia throughout the second half of the 11th century.

By 1090, Roupen was growing old; his command seems to have then passed entirely to his son Constantine, who in the same year conquered the strategic Cilician castle of Vahka (today Feke in Turkey).

Roupen died at the age of 70 (or 60); he was buried at the monastery of Castalon.

Marriage and children 
The name of Roupen’s wife is unknown. His recorded children are:
Constantine I of Cilicia (1035/1055 – 24 February 1102 / 23 February 1103)
(?) Thoros of Marash (according to Rüdt-Collenberg, he was the brother of Constantine I; it is not known what evidence this claim is based on but it should be treated with caution)

Footnotes

Sources 
Ghazarian, Jacob G: The Armenian Kingdom in Cilicia during the Crusades: The Integration of Cilician Armenians with the Latins (1080–1393); RoutledgeCurzon (Taylor & Francis Group), 2000, Abingdon;

External links 
The Barony of Cilician Armenia (Kurkjian's History of Armenia, Ch. 27)
 The Rupenids

11th-century births
1095 deaths
11th-century Armenian people
Monarchs of the Rubenid dynasty